Night Probe! is an adventure novel by Clive Cussler. This is the 5th book featuring the author’s primary protagonist, Dirk Pitt. Published in 1981, it is set in the near future of 1989, a date with ironic significance (see below).

The book's plot includes a major element of secret history.

Plot introduction
The world is in the throes of an energy crunch and the United States is on the brink of financial disaster.  Desperate to find any solution that can save the nation from national bankruptcy, the President of the United States looks to Dirk Pitt and NUMA to pull off an audacious double salvage operation.

Explanation of the novel's title
Cussler, through the character Pitt, claims that "Night Probe" is an old diving term for exploring the darkness of underwater caves.

Plot summary
It is 1989 and the United States is in an economic decline because "From Franklin Roosevelt on, every chief executive has played a game of tag, pinning a multiplying financial burden on the office of his successor" (said by the POTUS in part 1), and by increasing scarcity of oil.

CIA estimates put the depletion of the Middle East oilfields at just two years away. The total worldwide demand for oil is more than 50% of estimated supplies and while nuclear and other alternative energies are trying to make up the difference they are coming up short. Canada is now the exclusive supplier of electricity to several states in the Northeastern U.S. after investing billions in a massive new hydro-electric power plant in Quebec. To make matters worse, a top-secret experimental sub developed by NUMA has recently discovered a stratigraphic trap, potentially the richest kind of oil deposit, which lies just across the border in the territorial waters of Quebec.

Radicals in Quebec resembling the FLQ, secretly led by French Canadian MP Henri Villon, are pushing for a referendum on the independence of Quebec from Canada.  Newly elected Canadian Prime Minister Charles Sarveux fears that if Quebec declares independence Canada will disintegrate as the other provinces either follow Quebec into independence or possibly petition the U.S. for statehood.

Heidi Milligan, a U.S. Navy Lieutenant Commander, is working on her PhD in history by researching the naval policies of President Woodrow Wilson between assignments. She stumbles across a reference to a "North American Treaty" in a long forgotten letter and is intrigued when she finds out that all traces of the treaty appear to have been erased from the National Archives.

The North American Treaty, it is later revealed, was a landmark agreement between the United States and the United Kingdom.  In 1914, the U.K. had found itself in economic hard times with a world war looming on the horizon. Fearing that the nation will not survive without a large infusion of capital, the British Prime Minister, H. H. Asquith, with the cooperation of King George V, quietly approached the United States government and offered, for the sum of one billion dollars, to sell Canada to the United States. President Wilson quickly agreed and paid a down payment of $150 million to seal the deal.  Tragedy strikes when, on the same day in May 1914, the American copy of the treaty plunges to the bottom of the Hudson River when the Manhattan Limited express passenger train attempts to cross a downed railroad bridge and the British copy plunges to the bottom of the St. Lawrence River when the liner RMS Empress of Ireland is accidentally rammed by the Norwegian collier SS Storstad. With both nation's copies of the treaty lost and the British cabinet outraged at having Canada sold off without their knowledge, Wilson orders all records of the treaty destroyed and records the $150 million payment as a war loan.

Now that knowledge of the treaty has once again emerged, the President of the United States orders NUMA and Dirk Pitt to attempt to recover the copies of the treaty, which have both lain submerged for more than 70 years. The treaty becomes the cornerstone in the President’s plan to save the United States from national bankruptcy by proposing an audacious plan, to merge the United States and Canada into one nation, "the United States of Canada."

The British see the loss of Canada to the United States as the start of the unacceptable and unthinkable disintegration of their Empire. If Canada is allowed to leave the Empire, so too might Australia, or even Wales and Scotland. The British Secret Intelligence Service recalls one of their best former agents, Brian Shaw, from retirement and orders him to keep an eye on the American salvage efforts and to ensure the destruction of the North American Treaty at all costs.

The salvage team decides to try for the St. Lawrence copy of the treaty on the grounds that this copy would have been packed in waterproof material to guard against the risk of damage on the sea voyage. Despite efforts by Shaw and hired thug Foss Gly to sabotage the project, the treaty is recovered, but it transpires that the waterproof covering was unable to withstand several decades of immersion and the document has turned to pulp.

They then try to recover the Hudson copy, hoping that some freak of chance will have saved it from a similar fate. The atmosphere becomes increasingly panicked as extensive searches fail to discover any trace of the wrecked train, either in the wreckage of the bridge or elsewhere in the river. Extra suspense is provided by the mystery of the "ghost train" which on stormy nights howls up the abandoned trackbed and suddenly vanishes on reaching the site of the bridge.

Pitt solves this particular mystery by chance—walking along the trackbed one night the "ghost train" passes him and he sees that it is faked by means of a locomotive headlight and a PA playing locomotive sounds running along a cableway strung above the trackbed. This gives him the clue as to the whereabouts of the real train—it was in fact the victim of an elaborate scheme to rob it of a cargo of bullion. One group of robbers demolished the bridge with black powder charges, then staged a holdup of the nearest station; while one of them kept the stationmaster at gunpoint on the floor, another, who remained outside, played a gramophone record of train sounds and flashed a lantern through the windows to give the impression of a passing train, misleading the stationmaster into thinking that he had failed to prevent the train tumbling off the downed bridge. In fact another group of robbers had hijacked the train further up the line, diverted it along a disused spur into an abandoned underground quarry, and then blown up the entrance to the quarry. concealing the train and allowing them to remove the heavy load of bullion at their leisure through the quarry's old ventilation tunnels.

Pitt locates the quarry and discovers that the robber gang had failed to ascertain whether the ventilation tunnels were actually passable; in fact they were flooded, trapping both robbers and train passengers in the quarry to starve to death. Pitt passes through the tunnels by means of diving equipment and finds the train. Shaw, meanwhile, has mined into the quarry from above and arrives at almost the same moment. There is a fight for the possession of the treaty—which is intact—and Pitt is victorious.

Pitt races desperately to deliver the treaty to the President before he delivers a crucial address in which possession of the treaty will be decisive. He makes it by the skin of his teeth. The President receives the treaty, announces that from now on Canada and the U.S. will be united as "The United States of Canada".

Heidi Milligan and Pitt say goodbye at John F. Kennedy Airport, where Pitt has arranged for Shaw (who is currently under arrest as an enemy agent) to also say goodbye. After Heidi leaves to board her plane, Pitt informs Shaw that he has arranged for Shaw's release and departure on the same plane with Heidi, claiming that "The President owes me a favor." Shaw releases himself from his handcuffs and Pitt remarks, "James Bond would have been proud of you ... I hear you two were quite close."

Characters in "Night Probe!"

Dirk Pitt – Special Projects Director for the National Underwater and Marine Agency (NUMA)
Admiral James Sandecker – Chief director of NUMA
Al Giordino – Assistant special projects director for NUMA.
Rudi Gunn – Director of logistics for NUMA.
Heidi Milligan – U.S. Navy lieutenant commander working on her PhD in history in her spare time.  Milligan discovers the first evidence of the North American Treaty and sets the plot in motion.  Heidi Milligan also appeared as a supporting character in the previous Dirk Pitt novel Vixen 03.
Brian Shaw – Former officer from the British Secret Intelligence Service who was forced to retire when he became so well known to the Soviets that he could not operate in the open without drawing attention from SMERSH assassination teams. Shaw is pulled from retirement to work against the Americans in the quest for the North American Treaty. Shaw is strongly hinted, and explicitly noticed in his last conversation with Pitt, to be James Bond living under an assumed name.
Foss Gly – An American expatriate who leads a team of assassins he terms “specialists” doing the dirty work for the radical Free Québec Society.  Gly is also a master of disguise and impersonation.
Henry Villon – Liberal Party member of the House of Commons of Canada and the secret head of the Free Québec Society.
Alan Mercier – United States National Security Advisor
Charles Sarveux – Newly elected Prime Minister of Canada

Allusions and references
(See also: Bennett, Colorado#Kiowa Crossing and train wreck)

The story was inspired by a train wreck that occurred in 1878 in the town of Bennett, Colorado (then known as Kiowa Crossing) in which a Kansas Pacific Railway train was swept away when a rail bridge washed out. Most of the wreck was recovered save for the locomotive. Ironically, in 1989 (the year the novel takes place) it was discovered that the Kansas Pacific Railway had secretly recovered the locomotive and placed it back into service, yet still wrote it off and therefore committed insurance fraud. A further ironic point was that Canada would sever its last legal dependence on the British government in 1982, the year after the book was published, with the passage of the Canada Act.

In Night Probe! the prologue is set in May 1914 just prior to the outbreak of World War I. Several historical figures of the period are referenced fictionally including President Woodrow Wilson, Secretary of State William Jennings Bryan, British Prime Minister H. H. Asquith, Canadian Prime Minister Robert Borden and King George V.

A common feature of the Dirk Pitt novels are references and story themes based on maritime and ecological science. In Night Probe! the introduction of advanced Side-scan sonar technology to search for oil and other energy and mineral content below the surface of the sea is a primary plot device.

Release details
1981, USA, Bantam Books  , August 1981, Hardback
1984, USA, Bantam Books (Reissue Edition)  , June 1, 1984, Mass Market Paperback
1988, USA, Bantam Books  , July 1988, Paperback

References

1981 American novels
Novels set in the 1910s
Novels set in the 1980s
Dirk Pitt novels
American adventure novels
American thriller novels
James Bond parodies
Canada–United States relations in popular culture
Novels set in New York (state)
Novels set in Canada
Novels set in Quebec
Fiction set in 1914
Fiction set in 1989
Peak oil books
Viking Press books
Secret histories
Secret Intelligence Service in fiction
Cultural depictions of George V
Cultural depictions of Woodrow Wilson
H. H. Asquith